Martiros M. Vartanov is a graduate of UCLA and the founder of DOC LA - Los Angeles Documentary Film Festival - presented by the Parajanov-Vartanov Institute in Hollywood, California.

References

External links

Parajanov-Vartanov Institute Parajanov-Vartanov Institute
Hollywood Reporter F. F. Coppola on Parajanov-Vartanov Institute Awards
Deadline Hollywood on Parajanov-Vartanov Institute's DOC LA film festival
Criterion Criterion 
LA Weekly 2019
LA Weekly 2018
LA Weekly 2011
The Moscow Times The Moscow Times
Screen International Screen International on the institute's DocLA festival.
Fipresci.org, FIPRESCI on the institute's retrospective at Busan International Film Festival
DOC LA Film Festival DOC LA Film Festival

Organization founders
University of California, Los Angeles alumni
Year of birth missing (living people)
Living people